is a type of green tea. The name of mecha derives from the early leaf buds needed to make this special green tea. Mecha is harvested in spring and made as rolled leaf teas that are graded somewhere between Gyokuro and Sencha in quality. Mecha is made from a collection of leaf buds and tips of the early crops.

Popularity
Mecha's bitter qualities make it a good tea to drink after meals to cleanse the palate.

Flavor and aroma
Mecha is renowned for its depth of flavor, considerable astringency and bitter green aftertaste. The distinctive, sharp flavor and aroma of Mecha is often regarded as being as good as the best Sencha. The best Mecha produces an aromatic tea with a clear, soft yellow appearance.

See also
List of Japanese green teas

References

Green tea
Japanese tea